Necdet Öztorun (1924, Konya - 7 October 2010, Ankara) was a Turkish general. He was Commander of the First Army of Turkey (1983 - 1984) and then Commander of the Turkish Army (1985 - 1987).

Öztorun graduated from the Turkish Military Academy in 1943 and the Turkish Military College in 1959. He retired in 1987.

References 

1924 births
2010 deaths
People from Konya
Turkish Military Academy alumni
Army War College (Turkey) alumni
Turkish Army generals
Commanders of the Turkish Land Forces